Solar power in Georgia on rooftops can provide 31% of all electricity used in Georgia.

Net metering is limited to 100 kW for non-residential consumers and 10 kW for residential consumers, up to 0.2% of previous years peak demand. Georgia was given an F for net metering.  Georgia is not a Net Metering State.

The state's first solar community is located at Weatherford Place in Roswell. All homes are LEED Certified Platinum and monitored. The solar generation is compared to GP totals each month. The past 6 years of data monitoring show that GP meter consistently records less produced power. GP does not pay "time of day rates" as do many other states and also requires the homeowner to sign over all "environmental attributes" [solar renewable energy credits or SRECs] if the homeowner chooses to sell back all solar energy. Similar results are being seen at a Zero Net Energy home [the architectural design and training was a pro-bono project of Cadmus Design-Build  and is being monitored by UGA] located in Tifton, GA. In other states such as California, New Jersey, New York, North Carolina, Pennsylvania, etc.] the accumulated SRECs can be sold by the owner of the system. Georgia does not allow the sale of SRECs. Georgia Power is also charging the homeowner tax on the solar energy that is sold back to GP. According to the Database of State Incentives for Renewable Energy, Renewable energy is not taxable.

Georgia Power has a solar purchase program, SP-1, for up to 100 kW systems which pays 17¢/kWh. A second meter is installed for the solar generation, all of which is purchased by Georgia Power. The consumer then purchases back any electricity consumed as if they did not have solar power. The program has an aggregate limit of 4.4 MW and is fully subscribed, but will be expanded as consumers purchase "Premium Green Energy", for an additional $5.00/100kWh. Once a consumer enters the program there is no reason to also purchase green energy, as doing so would reduce the 17 cent payment to 12 cents. By comparison, Ontario paid 80¢Canadian/kWh, and Germany €34.05¢/kWh, both with 20 year contracts, vs. the 5-year contract from Georgia Power. Long term power agreements are essential to renewable energy projects, as you pay upfront for 25 years of electricity - the "fuel", the sun or wind, is free, and most of the cost of wind power or solar power is the installation cost.

Approved by the state's Public Service Commission in 2012 and significantly expanded in the following year, Georgia Power's 'Advanced Solar Initiative' is expected to bring online 865 MW of solar capacity by the end of 2016.

In 1982 the country's largest industrial solar installation was completed, the 400 kW Solar Total Energy Project, which operated until 1991.

The $5 million 1 MW Spectro PowerCap on the Hickory Ridge Landfill near Atlanta was one of Georgia's largest solar arrays, when it was completed in October 2011. Another 1MW solar farm in Blairsville was completed in January 2011.

A 30 MW solar farm is being developed in Social Circle, and is expected to be completed in 2015.

In 2011, Georgia was one of three states being considered for a 400 MW solar park, to consist of 20 20 MW sections. Other states being considered were Florida and North Carolina. Gadsden County, Florida, was chosen. The company, National Solar, is planning 3,000 MW of solar farms in the Southeast.

Statistics

See also

Solar power in the United States
Renewable energy in the United States

References

External links
Incentives and policies
Georgia Solar Energy Association
Georgia Solar Map

Georgia
Economy of Georgia (U.S. state)
Energy in Georgia (U.S. state)